Lop may refer to:  
 Lop County, county in Hotan, Xinjiang, China
 Lop language, a language spoken in Lop County, China
 Lop Desert, a desert in China
 Lop Nur, a group of small, now seasonal salt lake sand marshes 
 Lop rabbit, several breeds of rabbits whose ears lie flat

People with the surname
 Ferdinand Lop (1891–1974), French politician

See also
 LOP (disambiguation), a three-letter abbreviation
 Lopburi (disambiguation)
 Lope (disambiguation)